Vicente Moscardó Ferrando (born 5 April 1987 in Valencia) is a Spanish professional footballer who plays for Atzeneta UE as a defensive midfielder.

External links

1987 births
Living people
Footballers from Valencia (city)
Spanish footballers
Association football midfielders
Segunda División players
Segunda División B players
Tercera División players
Valencia CF Mestalla footballers
CD Puertollano footballers
UD Las Palmas Atlético players
UD Las Palmas players
Deportivo Alavés players
CD Toledo players
Polideportivo Ejido footballers
CD San Roque de Lepe footballers
Real Unión footballers
Coruxo FC players
Huracán Valencia CF players
Mérida AD players
CD Olímpic de Xàtiva footballers